Venu Arvind is an Indian actor. He is known for his roles in television serials of K. Balachander and Kovai Anuradha. He initially gained popularity as lead hero of television serials with Costly Mappilai (1996), Green Signal (1997) both directed by Kovai Anuradha. Then K. Balachander directed him in Kadhal Pagadai (1997), Kasalavu Nesam (1999).

He played the leading antagonist Ranga in the television soap Alaigal was a super successful and his role was popular among the audiences even now.

He debuted as a director with the film Sabash Sariyaana Potti. He is married to Shoba since 1987 and the couple have two children, a daughter, Veena and a son, Vijay. He was the first TV actor to win kalaimamani award in 2007.

Filmography 
As actor

As director
Sabash Sariyana Potti (2011)

As dubbing artist
Vilangu Meen (1985) - Dubbed for Hariprasad
May Madham (1994) - Dubbed for Vineeth

Television serials

References 

Living people
1965 births
Tamil male actors
Tamil theatre
Tamil film directors
Tamil male television actors
Television personalities from Tamil Nadu
Male actors from Tamil Nadu
Male actors in Tamil cinema
Male actors in Malayalam cinema
20th-century Indian male actors
21st-century Indian male actors